The Fortune Teller is an oil on canvas painting dating to approximately 1620 by French painter, Valentin de Boulogne, a follower of Caravaggio. It is now held in the Toledo Museum of Art, in Toledo, Ohio. The theme of the painting is the dangers that could be found in the streets of Rome at the time and includes various figures robbing each other. The theme of fortune tellers was common among Caravaggio's followers in Rome, with several of Valentin's contemporaries, such as Bartolomeo Manfredi, also making variations upon Caravaggio's prototypes.

Further reading
 Franklin, David, and Sebastian Schutze, Caravaggio and His Followers in Rome, New Haven, Connecticut Yale University Press, 2011, cat. no. 16, p. 171, p. 90, 102,107, 110, 113,114 117,170 172, 298, 316.
 Lemoine, Annick, and Keith Christiansen, Valentin de Boulogne: Beyond Caravaggio, New York, The Metropolitan Museum of Art, 2016, p. 121-122, repr. (col.) pl. 15, p. 120 (in the Louvre edition of catalogue, pp. 131-133, repr. (col.) cat. 15, p. 132).
 Russell, Francais, "Valentin's Fortune Teller," Burlington, vol. 124, no. 953, August 1982, p. 507.

References

Paintings in the collection of the Toledo Museum of Art
Paintings by Valentin de Boulogne